Sullivan may refer to:

People

Characters
 Chloe Sullivan, from the television series Smallville
 Colin Sullivan, a character in the film The Departed, played by Matt Damon
 Harry Sullivan (Doctor Who), from the British science fiction television series Doctor Who
 James P. "Sulley" Sullivan, a character in the Monsters, Inc. franchise
 John 'Sully' Sullivan, from the television series Third Watch
 John L. Sullivan, protagonist in the film Sullivan's Travels
 Jordan Sullivan, from the television series Scrubs
 Morgan Sullivan, an alias of the fictional protagonist of the film Cypher
 Sam Sullivan, from the television series The Loop
 Sieglinde Sullivan, a character from the manga and anime Black Butler
 Sullivan, a character from the manga and anime Welcome to Demon School! Iruma-kun
 Victor Sullivan, character from the video game Uncharted franchise
 Walter Sullivan (Silent Hill), an antagonist of the video game Silent Hill 4: The Room
 William "Rocky" Sullivan, protagonist in the film Angels with Dirty Faces

Places

Canada 
Sullivan, Quebec

United States 
Sullivan, Illinois
Sullivan, Indiana
Sullivan, Kentucky
Sullivan, Maine
Sullivan, Missouri
Sullivan, New Hampshire
Sullivan, New York
Sullivan, Ohio
 Sullivan, Virginia
 Sullivan, Raleigh County, West Virginia
 Sullivan, Randolph County, West Virginia
Sullivan (town), Wisconsin
Sullivan, Wisconsin, a village within the town
Sullivan City, Texas

Craters 
 Sullivan (Mercurian crater)
 Sullivan (Venusian crater)

Music
 Sullivan Foundation, a non-profit organization dedicated to finding, developing, and furthering the careers of promising opera singers in the United States
 Sullivan (band), an alternative rock band from Greensboro, North Carolina
 Sir Arthur Sullivan (1842–1900), composer, of the team Gilbert and Sullivan
 "Sullivan" (song), a 1997 song by Caroline's Spine

Other uses
 Sullivan reaction, a chemical reaction
 Sullivan Expedition, a United States Revolutionary War offensive against the Seneca Nation of Indians
 Silky Sullivan, racehorse
 New York Times Co. v. Sullivan, a United States Supreme Court case
 Sullivan & Company, a brand engagement firm
 Sullivan's Index, a health metric
 Sullivan (play), a comedy by Anne-Honoré-Joseph Duveyrier de Mélésville

See also 
 Sulivan, a surname
 Sullavan
 O'Sullivan (disambiguation)
 Sullivan County (disambiguation)
 Sullivan Township (disambiguation)
 Justice Sullivan (disambiguation)